Tomás Alberto Hervás Girón (born 25 November 1970) is a Spanish retired footballer who played as a midfielder, and a current assistant  manager of Sporting Gijón.

Playing career
Born in Ponferrada, Castile and León, Tomás graduated from Sporting de Gijón's youth setup, and made his senior debuts with the reserves, playing several seasons in Segunda División B. On 1 September 1991 he appeared in his first competitive match with the main squad – and in La Liga – starting in a 1–0 away win against Real Valladolid.

In 1998, Tomás moved to Celta de Vigo also in the top division. With the Galician club he appeared regularly, and won the UEFA Intertoto Cup in 2000.

After a short stint at Sevilla FC (being deemed surplus to requirements at the very end), Tomás signed for Segunda División club UD Las Palmas in January 2003. He suffered relegation with the Canarians in his second year, and subsequently left at the end of the 2004–05 campaign.

In the 2005 summer, Tomás joined AD Universidad de Oviedo, being promoted to the third level at the first attempt. After the team's relegation in the following season he announced his retirement, but returned to active in January 2008 only to leave the game definitively in June.

Manager career
In July 2009, Tomás was appointed Abelardo's assistant manager at Sporting de Gijón B. After being the first team's assistant for one year, he coached the reserves in the last match of 2013–14, against Burgos CF.

On 16 June 2014, Tomás was definitely appointed at the helm of the B-side, signing a one-year deal, being sacked on 6 April 2016. On 27 December 2019, he was appointed Abelardo's assistant at RCD Espanyol.

Managerial statistics

Honours
Celta
UEFA Intertoto Cup: 2000

References

External links

Celta de Vigo biography 

1970 births
Living people
People from Ponferrada
Sportspeople from the Province of León
Spanish footballers
Footballers from Castile and León
Association football midfielders
La Liga players
Segunda División players
Segunda División B players
Tercera División players
Sporting de Gijón B players
Sporting de Gijón players
RC Celta de Vigo players
Sevilla FC players
UD Las Palmas players
Spain under-21 international footballers
Spanish football managers